Ericeia canipuncta is a moth in the  family Erebidae. It is found on the Solomon Islands.

References

Moths described in 1929
Ericeia